is a Japanese professional racing cyclist, who currently rides for UCI Continental team .

Major results

2005
 2nd Time trial, National Under-23 Road Championships
2006
 3rd Time trial, National Under-23 Road Championships
2007
 1st  Time trial, National Under-23 Road Championships
2008
 1st Stage 7 Jelajah Malaysia
 1st Stage 1b (TTT) Brixia Tour
2010
 2nd Kumamoto International Road Race
 3rd Japan Cup Cycle Road Race
 8th Overall Tour de Okinawa
2011
 1st Shimano Road Race
 5th Japan Cup Cycle Road Race
 6th Overall Tour de Okinawa
1st Stage 2
 9th Overall Tour de Hokkaido
2012
 2nd Tour de Okinawa
 8th Road race, National Road Championships
 9th Overall Tour de Taiwan
 9th Overall Tour of Thailand
1st Points classification
 9th Japan Cup Cycle Road Race
2014
 5th Tour de Okinawa
 7th Road race, National Road Championships
2015
 2nd Road race, National Road Championships
 10th Overall Tour de Ijen
 10th Japan Cup Cycle Road Race
2016
 9th Tour de Okinawa
2017
 1st  Road race, National Road Championships
 3rd Tour de Okinawa
 7th Overall Tour de Tochigi
 10th Japan Cup Cycle Road Race
2018
 1st  Team time trial, Asian Road Championships
 6th Tour de Okinawa
2019
 9th Tour de Okinawa

References

External links

1985 births
Living people
Japanese male cyclists